Brent Staples (born 1951) is an American author and member of the editorial board of The New York Times, where he specializes in coverage of education, criminal justice and economics. His books include An American Love Story and Parallel Time: Growing up In Black and White, He writes about political, social and cultural issues, including race and the state of the American school system.

His memoir Parallel Time was a finalist for the Los Angeles Times Book Prize and winner of the Anisfield-Wolf Book Award. He won the 2019 Pulitzer Prize for Editorial Writing and is a fellow of the Society of American Historians. He has also been a visiting fellow at several academic institutions.

Early life and education
Staples was born in 1951 in Chester, Pennsylvania the oldest of nine children, his parents moved from rural Virginia to Chester as part of the Second Great Migration of Southern Blacks to urban centers in the North. His father was a truck driver and his mother a homemaker. By the time Staples was in the eighth grade, his family had moved within Chester seven times, often due to their inability to pay the rent. His family had no money for tuition; his grades were average, and he had taken only a few high-level academic courses in high school. The expectation was that he would go straight to work, most likely at one of the shipyards in Chester.

He was convinced to attend Widener University (then known as Penn Morton College) by the only African American professor at the school as part of a program named Project Prepare. He graduated from Widener University with a B.A. degree in 1973. He was awarded two doctoral fellowships from the Danforth Foundation and the Ford Foundation.  Staples received a master's degree in psychology in 1976 and a Ph.D. in the discipline in 1982 from the University of Chicago.

In 1983, his younger brother, Blake, a cocaine dealer, was murdered by a client, which forced Staples to reconsider his own success and his inability to stop his brother's life choices.

Career
Staples taught psychology at Widener University and various institutions in Chicago from 1977 to 1981, but began to pursue a separate career track in journalism. In 1983, he was hired as a science writer by the Chicago Sun-Times.  In 1985, Staples joined the staff of The New York Times as an editor of the Book Review and subsequently became assistant metropolitan editor. His essay "Just Walk on By: Black Men and Public Space", published in Ms. Magazine in 1986, was so influential that it soon became required reading in numerous college courses. In 1990, he was appointed to the newspaper's editorial board.

In 1994, his memoir, Parallel Time, was a finalist for the Los Angeles Times Book Prize and winner of the Anisfield-Wolf Book Award.

In a 1994 interview with Paul Galloway of the Chicago Tribune, Staples reflected: "Being Black enriches my experience; it doesn't define me .... I'm writing about universal themes – family and leaving home and developing your own identity – which all Americans can enjoy and understand." As a writer, he works to correct the myth that the American "Black experience" is defined only by poverty, violence, and crime. In the same interview, he stated: "I despise the expression ['Black experience']. There is no such thing. Black people's lives in this country are too varied to be reduced to a single term."

In 2000, Staples received an honorary doctorate degree in humane letters from Mount Saint Mary College. He has served as a visiting fellow at such institutions as the Hoover Foundation, the University of Chicago and Yale University.

In 2019, Staples won the Pulitzer Prize for Editorial Writing.  His editorials highlighted the history of racism in the United States and were described by the Pulitzer Prize committee as being "written with extraordinary moral clarity".

Bibliography
Just Walk on By:  Black Men and Public Spaces, Ms. Magazine, 1986
Parallel Time: Growing Up in Black and White, Pantheon Books, 1994, 
An American Love Story, Random House, 1999,

References

1951 births
20th-century African-American writers
20th-century American male writers
21st-century African-American writers
21st-century American male writers
Chicago Sun-Times people
Date of birth missing (living people)
Journalists from Pennsylvania
Living people
People from Chester, Pennsylvania
Pulitzer Prize for Editorial Writing winners
The New York Times editorial board
The New York Times writers
University of Chicago alumni
Widener University alumni
Widener University faculty